The Comedy of Terrors is a 1963 American International Pictures horror comedy film directed by Jacques Tourneur and starring Vincent Price, Peter Lorre, Basil Rathbone, Boris Karloff, and (in a cameo) Joe E. Brown in his final film appearance. It is a blend of comedy and horror which features several cast members from Tales of Terror, made by AIP the year before.

Plot
In the New England town of New Gilead during the late 19th century, unscrupulous drunkard Waldo Trumbull (Vincent Price) runs a funeral parlor that he acquired from his former business partner, Amos Hinchley (Boris Karloff). Trumbull is unhappily married to Hinchley's daughter, Amaryllis (Joyce Jameson). 

Trumbull enlists fugitive picklock Felix Gillie (Peter Lorre) as his assistant. They repeatedly reuse the firm's only coffin to save money, dumping the deceased, and occasionally murder wealthy clients to increase business. Trumbull routinely is abusive to Amaryllis, while secretly and unsuccessfully poisoning her senile father to accelerate an inheritance. Gillie is in love with Amaryllis and ineptly tries to seduce her, but she remains faithful to Trumbull. Meanwhile, Trumbull wastes money on alcohol and business is dwindling.

When threatened with eviction by his landlord, John F. Black (Rathbone), for overdue rent, Trumbull plans to murder a wealthy shipping magnate and charge the heirs for elaborate funeral services. Trumbull discovers the day of the funeral that the magnate's trophy wife has absconded with her husband's fortune without paying his fees.

After a final demand for the rent, Trumbull sends Gillie to murder Black. Gillie flees when he finds Black awake and reciting Shakespeare, but Black is startled and suffers a heart attack. A physician pronounces him dead. No one is aware that Black suffers from catalepsy. 

Trumbull and Gillie transport Black to the mortuary, where an allergy to Amaryllis' cat, Cleopatra, awakens him. They prevent him from escaping, but Black suffers another heart attack. While returning him to the coffin, Black revives again and Trumbull knocks him out. The funeral proceeds without anyone else aware that Black is alive, and he is placed in his family crypt.

Trumbull gets drunk and counts his ill-gotten gains. Following another of Gillie's crude seductions, Amaryllis tries desperately to get Trumbull's attention but is rebuffed.  She relents and decides to run off with Gillie. Black, who awoke and escaped his tomb, enters the parlor and grabs an axe. Amaryllis faints. Black chases Trumbull and Gillie around the house. Gillie falls down a flight of stairs and is unconscious. Trumbull shoots Black, who gives a final Shakespearean monologue before finally dying.

Amaryllis comes to and thinks Gillie is dead by Trumbull's hand. She threatens to call the police, and Trumbull strangles her. Gillie awakens and attacks Trumbull with a sword; Trumbull knocks him out with a poker. Black's servant arrives, sees the chaos, and runs off to inform the police. 

Trumbull collapses to the floor. Amaryllis and Gillie revive and run off together. Hinchley, who slept through the commotion, tries to revive Trumbull with a vial of "medicine". Trumbull realizes he has drunk his own poison and drops dead. Cleopatra walks over to Black, whose allergy awakens him again.

Main cast
 Vincent Price as  Waldo Trumbull
 Peter Lorre as Felix Gillie
 Boris Karloff as Amos Hinchley
 Basil Rathbone as John F. Black, Esq.
 Joyce Jameson as Amaryllis Trumbull
 Joe E. Brown as the Cemetery Keeper
 Beverly Powers (credited as Beverly Hills) as Mrs. Phipps
 Alan DeWitt as Riggs
 Buddy Mason as Mr. Phipps
 Douglas Williams as the Doctor
 Linda Rogers as Phipps' Maid
 Luree Holmes as Black's Servant
 Rhubarb the cat as Cleopatra

Production
The film was a follow-up to The Raven, meant to reunite Vincent Price, Peter Lorre and Boris Karloff. The producers' original intention was for Karloff to play the part of the ceaselessly spry old landlord, Mr. Black, but, by the time production was set to begin, they realized that it would have been difficult (if not impossible) for Karloff to perform the physical requirements of the role, due to persistent back and leg problems which had worsened with age. So, Karloff traded roles with Basil Rathbone, and instead played Amaryllis' elderly father, Mr. Hinchley.

Richard Matheson later said he was "proud of that picture and of the fact that I got AIP [American International Pictures] to hire Tourneur. Earlier on, I had asked for Tourneur on one of my Twilight Zones... They said, 'Well, he's a movie director. I don't think he can handle this time schedule'  . . . As I recall, he did the shortest shooting schedule of anyone—twenty-eight hours. He had this book with every shot in it and detailed notes. He knew exactly what he was doing every inch of the way. He was so organized."

Release
The movie was not a big success at the box office. Matheson:
It didn't lose any money. They [AIP] told me that the title itself cost them a lot. It's such a contradiction in terms, though. Terror sells and comedy makes them go away, so it's like they're walking in two directions at once. But I thought it was very clever to do a take off of Shakespeare's, Comedy of Errors.... I think they were probably sorry they didn't use a Poe title, because Poe had a certain marketability. I guess they couldn't figure out how to market it. But it was the last one because I was getting tired of writing about people being buried alive, so I decided to make a joke about it.

Reception

Initial reception
The Comedy of Terrors received mixed to negative reviews upon its initial release. Howard Thompson of The New York Times wrote a scathing review, calling it "A musty, rusty bag of tricks rigged as a horror farce". Variety wrote that the film "leaves much to be desired. The raw material for a jovial spoof of chillers was there, but the comic restraint and perception necessary to capitalize on those natural resources is conspicuously missing." Philip K. Scheuer of the Los Angeles Times panned the film as "a series of predictable gags repeated ad infinitum, ad nauseum [sic]...I felt ashamed to watch once reputable actors hamming it up all over the place, making a mockery of whatever is left of their poor images." The Monthly Film Bulletin was somewhat positive, calling Price and Lorre "both splendid" and writing that Matheson's script "avoids the laxness which slowed down passages of The Raven, and constructs a soundly worked-out mechanism based on a minimum of running gags."

TV Guide awarded the film 2/5 stars, stating the "film is neither funny nor terrifying, and shows the fact that it was shot in 20 days on a 12-hour-a-day shooting schedule."

Later reception
Later reviews of the film have been more positive. Author and film critic Leonard Maltin gave the film 2.5 out of 4 stars, commending the film's cast. Paul Chambers from Movie Chambers.com gave the film a score B+, writing "An all-out horror comedy set in 19th century New England with some of the best names in the business. Besides Price, there's Boris Karloff, Peter Lorre, Basil Rathbone and in a small, but funny, segment, Joe E. Brown."  Time Out London felt that the film came dangerously close to failing, and criticized the script. However, it commended the film's cast.

On Rotten Tomatoes, the film holds an approval rating of 89% based on 9 reviews, with an average rating of 7.28/10.

Proposed sequel
Richard Matheson wanted to write a sequel film for AIP called Sweethearts and Horrors, which was intended to star Price as a ventriloquist, Karloff as a children's TV host, Rathbone as a musical comedy star, Lorre as a magician and Tallulah Bankhead. However Comedy of Terrors was not a big hit so plans to make the followup were shelved.

Novelisation
A novelization of The Comedy of Terrors was written in 1964 by Elsie Lee, adapted from Richard Matheson's screenplay. It was published by Lancer Books in paperback (making certain changes in the story's ending).

See also
 List of American films of 1963

References

External links

 
 
 
 
 

1964 films
1964 horror films
1960s comedy horror films
American comedy horror films
American International Pictures films
1960s English-language films
Films directed by Jacques Tourneur
Films scored by Les Baxter
Films set in the 19th century
Funeral homes in fiction
Films with screenplays by Richard Matheson
1964 comedy films
1963 comedy films
1963 films
American serial killer films
1960s American films